Sycamore Tavern, also known as Shelburn's Tavern and Florence L. Page Memorial Library, is a historic inn and tavern located near Montpelier, Hanover County, Virginia. It was built before 1804, and is a 1 1/2-story, three bay by two bay, frame structure, with a rear shed extension.  It is sheathed in weatherboard and has two exterior brick chimneys. An ordinary occupied the building through the 19th century.  During the first quarter of the 20th century, Thomas Nelson Page, the noted Virginia author, founded a library in the structure in memory of his wife, Florence Lathrop Field Page.

It was listed on the National Register of Historic Places in 1974.  It is located in the Montpelier Historic District.

References

Drinking establishments on the National Register of Historic Places in Virginia
Libraries on the National Register of Historic Places in Virginia
Commercial buildings completed in 1804
Buildings and structures in Hanover County, Virginia
National Register of Historic Places in Hanover County, Virginia
Individually listed contributing properties to historic districts on the National Register in Virginia